The gardens of the Winter Palace, St Petersburg, are little known, as the great imperial palace of the Romanovs was never intended to have gardens. As the Tsar's principal residence, situated in the capital, it was very much intended as a symbol of power rather than a place of relaxation and pleasure. 

Bordered by the River Neva on its northern side and Palace Square on its southern, the Winter Palace was devoid of space for gardens; however, the last two empresses of Russia each created gardens from previously paved areas.

In 1885, Tsaritsa Maria Feodorovna, wife of Alexander III, had a garden created in the principal courtyard, an area which had previously been paved. This was designed in a formal rectangular shape, reflecting the shape of the courtyard which contained it. The lawned garden was planted with trees and shrubs, and surrounded by a cobbled carriage drive which led from the palace's principal arched entrance on Palace Square to the various doors giving access to the palace's interior from the courtyard.

The second garden was created in 1896 for Tsaritsa Alexandra Feodorovna, wife of the last Tsar, Nicholas II, who lived briefly at the palace at the turn of the 20th century. She found the public access to all the exterior facades of the palace disconcerting, and disliked the way that the members of the public would stare at the windows of the private apartments in the western part of the palace. She also wished for an area where her children could play in privacy and seclusion, as a result she had a garden created on the parade ground beneath her windows. This was surrounded by a high wall topped with railings. The garden was created based on a project by landscape architect Georg Kuphaldt, the director of the Riga city gardens and parks.

References

  Hermitage Museum Website Published by the Russian state Hermitage Museum. Retrieved 23 September 2008.

Hermitage Museum
Cultural heritage monuments of federal significance in Saint Petersburg